Michael John Whelan HonFRMS FRS FInstP (born 2 November 1931) is a British scientist.

Education and Career 
Whelan completed his PhD at Gonville and Caius College, Cambridge under the supervision of Peter Hirsch. He held research posts at the University of Cambridge until 1966 when he moved to the University of Oxford. As of 2011, Whelan is Emeritus Professor in the Department of Materials at the University of Oxford, England, and an Emeritus Fellow of Linacre College, Oxford.

Awards 
In 1976 he was elected as Fellow of the Royal Society and Fellow of the Institute of Physics. He and Archibald Howie won the 1988 Hughes Medal of the Royal Society "for their contributions to the theory of electron diffraction and microscopy, and its application to the study of lattice defects in crystals".  He also received the 1998 Distinguished Scientist Award in Physical Sciences from the Microscopy Society of America and the 1965 C.V. Boys Prize from the Institute of Physics. In 2001 he was elected honorary fellow of the Royal Microscopical Society.  In 2011 he won the Gjønnes Medal in Electron Crystallography.

References

Publications

Sources
 Michael J. Whelan's homepage at Oxford University
 Prof M J Whelan, FRS Authorised Biography – Debrett's People of Today

1931 births
Living people
Place of birth missing (living people)
British physicists
British materials scientists
Microscopists
Fellows of Linacre College, Oxford
Fellows of the Royal Society
Honorary fellows of the Royal Microscopical Society